Idrettslaget Express is a Norwegian sports club from Fevik in Grimstad, Aust-Agder. It has sections for association football, team handball, basketball, floorball, athletics, orienteering and gymnastics.

It was founded on 1 May 1919. The club colors are red and white.

The men's football team currently plays in the 3. divisjon, the fourth tier of the Norwegian football league system.

References

External links
 Official site 
 Fevik Stadion - Nordic Stadiums
 OSM Stadion - Nordic Stadiums

Football clubs in Norway
Athletics clubs in Norway
Sport in Aust-Agder
Grimstad
Association football clubs established in 1919
1919 establishments in Norway